"Badman Riddim (Jump)" is a song by Dutch DJ/producer Vato Gonzalez featuring vocals from British hip hop/grime group Foreign Beggars. It was released on 19 June 2011 as a digital download in the United Kingdom. It contains samples of "Gojira Tai Mosura", the theme song from the 1992 sci-fi film Godzilla vs. Mothra, by Japanese composer Akira Ifukube. The same sample was used in the Pharoahe Monch hit song "Simon Says".

The song is featured as part of the soundtrack for FIFA Street.

Music video
A music video to accompany the release of "Badman Riddim (Jump)" was first released onto YouTube on 18 May 2011 at a total length of 2 minutes and fifty-two seconds.

Track listing

Charts

Weekly charts

Year-end charts

Certifications

Release history

References 

2011 singles
Vato Gonzalez songs
Ministry of Sound singles